Philip Michael Ondaatje (born 12 September 1943) is a Sri Lankan-born Canadian poet, fiction writer, essayist, novelist, editor, and filmmaker. 

Ondaatje's literary career began with his poetry in 1967, publishing The Dainty Monsters, and then in 1970 the critically acclaimed The Collected Works of Billy the Kid. His novel The English Patient (1992), adapted into a film in 1996 won the 2018 Golden Man Booker Prize.

Ondaatje has been "fostering new Canadian writing" with two decades commitment to Coach House Press (ca. 1970–1990), and his editorial credits include the journal Brick, and the Long Poem Anthology (1979), among others.

Early life and education

Ondaatje was born in Colombo, Sri Lanka in 1943, of Burgher descent (Dutch and Sinhalese). In 1954, he re-joined his mother in England. where he attended Dulwich College. He emigrated to Montreal, Quebec, in 1962, studying at Bishop's College School and Bishop's University in Lennoxville, Quebec, for three years. He attended the University of Toronto receiving a Bachelor of Arts degree in 1965, followed by a Master of Arts from Queen's University at Kingston.

The poet D.G Jones noted his poetic ability.

Ondaatje began teaching English at the University of Western Ontario in London, Ontario. In 1971, taught English literature at Glendon College, York University.

Work

Ondaatje has published 13 books of poetry, and won the Governor General's Award for The Collected Works of Billy the Kid (1970) and There's a Trick With a Knife I'm Learning to Do: Poems 1973–1978 (1979). Anil's Ghost (2000) was the winner of the 2000 Giller Prize, the Prix Médicis, the Kiriyama Pacific Rim Book Prize, the 2001 Irish Times International Fiction Prize and Canada's Governor General's Award. The English Patient (1992) won the Booker Prize, the Canada Australia Prize, and the Governor General's Award. It was adapted as a motion picture, which won the Academy Award for Best Picture and multiple other awards. In the Skin of a Lion (1987), a novel about early immigrants in Toronto, was the winner of the 1988 City of Toronto Book Award, finalist for the 1987 Ritz Paris Hemingway Award for best novel of the year in English, and winner of the first Canada Reads competition in 2002.

Coming Through Slaughter (1976), is a novel set in New Orleans, Louisiana, circa 1900, loosely based on the lives of jazz pioneer Buddy Bolden and photographer E. J. Bellocq. It was the winner of the 1976 Books in Canada First Novel Award.  Running in the Family (1982) is a childhood memoir.

Ondaatje's novel Divisadero won the 2007 Governor General's Award. In 2011 Ondaatje worked with Daniel Brooks to create a play based on this novel.

In 2018, his novel Warlight was longlisted for the Booker Prize.

Adaptations

The Collected Works of Billy the Kid, Coming Through Slaughter and Divisadero have been adapted for the stage and produced in theatrical productions across North America and Europe. In addition to The English Patient adaptation, Ondaatje's films include a documentary on poet B.P. Nichol, Sons of Captain Poetry, and The Clinton Special: A Film About The Farm Show, which chronicles a collaborative theatre experience led in 1971 by Paul Thompson of Theatre Passe Muraille. In 2002, Ondaatje published a non-fiction book, The Conversations: Walter Murch and the Art of Editing Film, which won special recognition at the 2003 American Cinema Editors Awards, as well as a Kraszna-Krausz Book Award for best book of the year on the moving image.

Honours

In 1988, Ondaatje was made an Officer of the Order of Canada which was later upgraded to grade of Companion in 2016, the highest level of the order and two years later a Foreign Honorary Member of the American Academy of Arts and Letters. 

In 2005, he received Sri Lanka Ratna, the highest honour given by the Government of Sri Lanka for foreign nationals.

In 2008, he received the Golden Plate Award of the American Academy of Achievement.

In 2016, a new species of spider, Brignolia ondaatjei, discovered in Sri Lanka, was named after him.

Public stand

In April 2015, Ondaatje was one of several members of PEN American Center who withdrew as literary host when the organization gave its annual Freedom of Expression Courage award to Charlie Hebdo. The award came in the wake of the shooting attack on the magazine's Paris offices in January 2015. Ondaatje claimed that, due to the magazine's anti-Islam content, it should not have been honoured.

Personal life

Since the 1960s, Ondaatje has been involved with Toronto's Coach House Books  as a poetry editor.  Ondaatje and his wife Linda Spalding, a novelist and academic, co-edit Brick, A Literary Journal, with Michael Redhill, Michael Helm, and Esta Spalding. Ondaatje served as a founding member of the board of trustees of the Griffin Trust for Excellence in Poetry from 2000 to 2018.

Ondaatje has two children with his first wife, Canadian artist Kim Ondaatje.  His brother Sir Christopher Ondaatje is a philanthropist, businessman and author.  Ondaatje's nephew David Ondaatje is a film director and screenwriter, who made the 2009 film The Lodger.

Books

Novels

 1976: Coming Through Slaughter (also see "Other" section, 1980, below), Toronto: Anansi, ; New York: W. W. Norton, 1977
 1987: In the Skin of a Lion, New York: Knopf, 
 1992: The English Patient, New York: Knopf, 
 2000: Anil's Ghost, New York: Knopf, 
 2007: Divisadero,  
 2011: The Cat's Table, 
 2018: Warlight,

Poetry collections

 1962: Social Call, The Love Story, In Search of Happiness, all featured in The Mitre: Lennoxville: Bishop University Press
 1967: The Dainty Monsters, Toronto: Coach House Press
 1969: The Man with Seven Toes, Toronto: Coach House Press
 1970: The Collected Works of Billy the Kid: Left-Handed Poems (also see "Other" section, 1973, below), Toronto: Anansi ; New York: Berkeley, 1975
 1973: Rat Jelly, Toronto: Coach House Press
 1978: Elimination Dance/La danse eliminatoire, Ilderton: Nairn Coldstream; revised edition, Brick, 1980
 1979: There's a Trick with a Knife I'm Learning to Do: Poems, 1963–1978, New York: W. W. Norton (New York, NY), 1979 , 
 published as Rat Jelly, and Other Poems, 1963–1978, London, United Kingdom: Marion Boyars, 1980
 1984: Secular Love, Toronto: Coach House Press,  ; New York: W. W. Norton, 1985
 1986: All along the Mazinaw: Two Poems (broadside), Milwaukee, Wisconsin: Woodland Pattern
 1986: Two Poems, Woodland Pattern, Milwaukee, Wisconsin
 1989: The Cinnamon Peeler: Selected Poems, London, United Kingdom: Pan; New York: Knopf, 1991
 1998: Handwriting, Toronto: McClelland & Stewart; New York: Knopf, 1999 
 2006: The Story, Toronto: House of Anansi,

Editor

 1971: The Broken Ark, animal verse; Ottawa: Oberon; revised as A Book of Beasts, 1979 
 1977: Personal Fictions: Stories by Munro, Wiebe, Thomas, and Blaise, Toronto: Oxford University Press 
 1979: A Book of Beasts, animal verse; Ottawa: Oberon; revision of The Broken Ark, 1971
 1979: The Long Poem Anthology, Toronto: Coach House 
 1989: With Russell Banks and David Young, Brushes with Greatness: An Anthology of Chance Encounters with Greatness, Toronto: Coach House, 1989
 1989: Edited with Linda Spalding, The Brick Anthology, illustrated by David Bolduc, Toronto: Coach House Press
 1990: From Ink Lake: An Anthology of Canadian Short Stories; New York: Viking 
 1990: The Faber Book of Contemporary Canadian Short Stories; London, United Kingdom: Faber
 2000: Edited with Michael Redhill, Esta Spalding and Linda Spalding, Lost Classics, Toronto: Knopf Canada ; New York: Anchor, 2001
 2002: Edited and wrote introduction, Mavis Gallant, Paris Stories, New York: New York Review Books

Other

 1966: The Offering - co-producer and co-screenwriter
 1970: Leonard Cohen (literary criticism), Toronto: McClelland & Stewart
 1973: The Collected Works of Billy the Kid (play; based on his poetry; see "Poetry" section, 1970, above), produced in Stratford, Ontario; produced in New York, 1974; produced in London, England, 1984
 1979: Claude Glass (literary criticism), Toronto: Coach House Press
 1980: Coming through Slaughter (play based on his novel; see "Novels" section, 1976, above), first produced in Toronto
 1982: Running in the Family, memoir, New York: W. W. Norton, 
 1982: Tin Roof, British Columbia, Canada: Island, 
 1987: In the Skin of a Lion (based on his novel), New York: Knopf
 1994: Edited with B. P. Nichol and George Bowering, An H in the Heart: A Reader, Toronto: McClelland & Stewart
 1996: Wrote introduction, Anthony Minghella, adaptor, The English Patient: A Screenplay, New York: Hyperion Miramax
 2002: The Conversations: Walter Murch and the Art of Editing Film, New York: Knopf, 
 2002: Films by Michael Ondaatje
 2004: Vintage Ondaatje,

See also

Ondaatje Letters
Sri Lankan Chetties
Christopher Ondaatje
Kim Ondaatje
Pearl Ondaatje
List of Bishop's College School alumni

Notes

Further reading

  Comparative Cultural Studies and Michael Ondaatje's Writing. Ed. Steven Tötösy de Zepetnek. West Lafayette: Purdue University Press, 2005.  
 Barbour, Douglas. Michael Ondaatje. New York: Twayne, 1993. 
 Jewinski, Ed. Michael Ondaatje: Express Yourself Beautifully. Toronto: ECW, 1994. 
 Tötösy de Zepetnek, Steven (斯蒂文·托托西演). 文学研究的合法化: 一种新实用主义 ·整体化和经主 义文学与文化研究方法 (Legitimizing the Study of Literature: A New Pragmatism and the Systemic Approach to Literature and Culture). Trans. Ma Jui-ch'i (马瑞琪翻). Beijing: Peking University Press, 1997. 111–34. 
 Tötösy de Zepetnek, Steven. "Cultures, Peripheralities, and Comparative Literature." in Steven Tötösy de Zepetnek (ed.). Comparative Literature: Theory, Method, Application. Amsterdam: Rodopi, 1998. 150–65.

External links

On Michael Ondaatje's late style, in the Literary Review of Canada, by Moez Surani.
 Jane Henderson (2 May 2016). "Ondaatje wins St. Louis Literary Award". St. Louis Post-Dispatch. Retrieved 22 July 2016.
 
 
"I came from a tussle with the sea": An interview with Michael Ondaatje, in Gulf Coast: A Journal of Literature and Fine Arts (24.2)
Full text of The Dainty Monsters
"Adventures in the Skin Trade" PEN World Voices at LIVE from the New York Public Library. 4 May 2008 (Video, 1hr, 6 min)
Transcript of interview with Ramona Koval on The Book Show, ABC Radio National on Divisadero recorded in Montreal, April 2007.
Profile. Emory University
Order of Canada Citation
Interview With Ondaatje, Salon, November 1996

1943 births
20th-century Canadian male writers
20th-century Canadian novelists
20th-century Canadian poets
21st-century Canadian male writers
21st-century Canadian novelists
21st-century Canadian poets
Bishop's College School alumni
Booker Prize winners
Burgher academics
Burgher poets
Burgher writers
Canadian Film Centre alumni
Canadian male novelists
Canadian male poets
Canadian people of Dutch descent
Canadian people of Tamil descent
Companions of the Order of Canada
Fellows of the Royal Society of Literature
Governor General's Award-winning fiction writers
Governor General's Award-winning poets
Harbourfront Festival Prize winners
Living people
People educated at Dulwich College
People from Colombo
People from British Ceylon
Prix Médicis étranger winners
Queen's University at Kingston alumni
Sri Lanka Rathna
Sri Lankan emigrants to Canada
University of Toronto alumni
Academic staff of the University of Western Ontario
Writers from Montreal
Writers from Toronto
Academic staff of York University
M
Amazon.ca First Novel Award winners
Academic staff of Glendon College